Time to Win, Vol. 1 is the first official EP from the Canadian band, Down with Webster. It released October 6, 2009 on Universal Motown. The album was successful in Canada, all three singles off the album charted in the top 25 on the Canadian Hot 100 and all three were certified Platinum.  The album has sold over 40,000 copies in Canada and was certified Gold in December, 2010.

Background and recording
The band said the reason to release "Time to Win" in two separate volumes was because: "As a band, we are constantly writing and recording, so instead of taking years to finish and deliver an album, releasing them this way enables us the freedom to get music out to our fans faster, more often, and for less money".

The majority of "Time to Win, Vol. 1" was recorded at Chill Ville Studios, Toronto. Additional recording happened at The Hit Factory Criteria, Miami. The album was mixed at various locations such as The Orange Lounge, Toronto and South Beach Studios, Miami. "Time to Win, Vol. 1" was mastered at Sterling Sound, New York City.

The album mainly has new songs except for "Miracle Mile" which was also on the bands self-released album was used on Universal Motowns insistence.

James Robertson and Down with Webster produced all of the tracks. Down with Webster had worked with Robertson previously on their self released album in 2007.

Composition
"Time to Win" was described by Ben Packard of rock-wire.com as the "perfect opening for the album" with "heavy beats" that are "incredibly catchy". "Whoa Is Me" had a "slower tempo" and "incredible mix of beats and guitar shredding" while "Your Man" had an "oriental" sound with vocal transitions being praised. "Rich Girl$" was described by Aryeh Carni of eatsleepbreatemusic.com as having a "cheesy 80′s sound like Eddie Money and it's got that guilty pleasure hook to go along". "Back of my Hand" is the only song on the album that does not have a rap verse. "Back of my Hand" begin with "rainstorms and keys" like "Stan" by Eminem. The song was described by Ben Packard of rock-wire.com as the "best song of the album". "Parade Music" is described by Ben Packard of rock-wire.com as the most "hip hop type of song" on the album and is "powerful" and "catchy" while "Miracle Mile" has "Lots of trumpet sound mixed in and combined with DJ beats". Aryeh Carni of eatsleepbreathemusic.com described the band as "built on beats and samples, heavy guitars and clever lyrical games".

Release and promotion
Time to Win, Vol. 1 was released on October 6, 2009. A CD release concert was performed in October, 2009 at the Phoenix Concert Theatre in Toronto. The show was attended by over 1,200 people.

WINtour 2010 was Down with Webster's first headlining tour. It took place from January to February 2010 and supported Time to Win, Vol. 1.  Down with Webster also opened for Forever the Sickest Kids (in the Cheap Date Tour), Timbaland (in the Shock Value II Tour) and 3OH!3 (in the Streets of Gold tour) to support the album.

The song "Time to Win" was used by the well known video game website machinima.com in a video montage for the game Tony Hawk: Ride. "Time to Win" was also used in season 10, episode 35 of Degrassi: The Next Generation.

Singles
The album's lead single, "Rich Girl$" was released in October, 2009 and peaked at #21 on the Canadian Hot 100. It was also certified Platinum in Canada in April, 2010. In the United States it was added over 20 times in one week and was played on over 60 Contemporary Hit Radio stations.

"Your Man" was released as the second single and is the most successful single to date. It was released in January 2010 and peaked at #12 on the Canadian Hot 100 and was also certified Platinum in Canada in April, 2010.

"Whoa Is Me" was released as the album's third single on June 15, 2010. It peaked at #13 on the Canadian Hot 100. It was certified Platinum in Canada in January, 2011.

Reception
The album sold over the 40,000 copies in Canada and certified Gold. All three singles ("Your Man", "Rich Girl$", and "Whoa Is Me") have been certified platinum singles in Canada, with "Your Man" and "Rich Girl$" having over 40,000 digital downloads and "Whoa Is Me" having over 80,000 digital downloads. "Time to Win, Vol. 1" has been nominated for Pop Album of the Year at the Juno Awards of 2011 which took place on March 27, 2011.

Track listing
All of the songs were produced by Down with Webster and James Robertson except where noted.

Sample credits
"Your Man" contains a sample of "Girl It Ain't Easy" performed by Honey Cone and written by Ronald Dunbar and Edyth Wayne
"Rich Girl$" contains elements of "Rich Girl" performed by Hall & Oates and written by Daryl Hall
"Miracle Mile" contains a sample of "Broadway Melody 1929" performed by Rubino Orchestra, and written by Arthur Freed and Nacio Herb Brown

Personnel

 Down with Webster – producer
 Tyler Armes – bass guitar, keyboards, composer
 Kyle "Kap" Fairlie – hype man
 Dave "Diggy" Ferris – DJ
 Patrick "Pat" Gillett – vocals, guitar, composer
 Cameron "Cam" Hunter – vocals, composer
 Andrew "Marty" Martino – drums, composer
 Martin "Bucky" Seja – vocals, composer
 Matt Barnes – photography
 Demacio "Demo" Castellon – executive producer, producer, mixing
 Chris Corless – A&R (Canada)
 Tom Coyne – mastering
 Jason "Metal" Donkersgoed – mixing assistant
 Chris Gehringer – mastering

 Chris Godbey – Pro Tools editing
 Shep Goodman – A&R
 Femio Hernandez – assistant
 Rob Hitt – A&R
 Jordan Jacobs and Ryan Armes (SPYBOX) – management
 Brandon Jones – recording assistant
 Lisa Linder – product manager
 Tom Lord-Alge – mixing
 Steve Nightingale – product manager (Canada)
 James Robertson – producer, recording, mixing
 Fareed Salamah – additional recording
 Julian Vasquez – additional recording
 Dan Warner – additional guitar

Charts and certifications

References

2009 EPs
Down with Webster albums